The following highways are numbered 312:

Canada
 Manitoba Provincial Road 312
 Nova Scotia Route 312
 Prince Edward Island Route 312
 Saskatchewan Highway 312

China
 China National Highway 312

Costa Rica
 National Route 312

Japan
 Japan National Route 312

United States
  U.S. Route 312 (former)
  Arkansas Highway 312
  Florida State Road 312
  Georgia State Route 312 (former)
  Indiana State Road 312
  Kentucky Route 312
  Louisiana Highway 312
  Maryland Route 312
  Minnesota State Highway 312 (former)
  New Mexico State Road 312
 New York:
  New York State Route 312
 New York State Route 312 (former)
 County Route 312 (Albany County, New York)
 County Route 312 (Wayne County, New York)
  Ohio State Route 312
  Pennsylvania Route 312 (former)
  Puerto Rico Highway 312
  Tennessee State Route 312
 Texas:
  Texas State Highway 312 (proposed)
  Texas State Highway Spur 312
  Farm to Market Road 312
  Utah State Route 312
  Virginia State Route 312
  Wisconsin Highway 312
  Wyoming Highway 312